Constantin J. David (18 February 1886 – 19 February 1964) was a German journalist, film director, film producer, and actor. He is also known for his marriage to the Hungarian actress, singer, and model Käthe von Nagy.

Biography

Early life and family 
The son of a Spanish Jewish mother and a German Jewish father, he lived in Constantinople in the Ottoman Empire, until the age of 16. Once in Germany, David first showed talent as a journalist and writer. He earned his doctorate at the Sorbonne in Paris, and went on to study literature and art in Berlin and then Munich. David then worked for a literary magazine until 1918. In 1921 he founded the International Institute of Modern Art, and from 1922 to 1925 he worked as a producer and co-owner of the German film company Greenbaum Filme.

Film career 
At the beginning of 1925, David took his first steps as a film director with the Greenbaum company's first film as a producer and co-director. After five years in this profession and a handful of moderately interesting productions (including two with his then-wife, actress Käthe von Nagy), he turned back to his studies in literature and art. From 1929 onwards he focused on the establishment of the first Italian sound film studios in Turin and Rome, and soon after he did the same thing in Spain.

War years and later life 
1936, at the outbreak of the Spanish Civil War, David left the country and went via Italy in 1937 to Turkey, where he designed a five-year plan for the state's film-making. During the Second World War David spend most of his time in France, after which he traveled to the United States to continue his film career. Constantin J. David died in 1964.

He married in 1941. He and his wife had two daughters.

Filmography

Footnotes

External links

19th-century German Jews
1886 births
1964 deaths
Emigrants from the Ottoman Empire to Germany
German expatriates in France
German emigrants to the United States
German male actors
German film directors
Male actors from Hamburg
German journalists
University of Paris alumni